A volume unit (VU) meter or standard volume indicator (SVI) is a device displaying a representation of the signal level in audio equipment. The original design was proposed in the 1940 IRE paper, A New Standard Volume Indicator and Reference Level, written by experts from CBS, NBC, and Bell Telephone Laboratories. The Acoustical Society of America then standardized it in 1942 (ANSI C16.5-1942) for use in telephone installation and radio broadcast stations. Consumer audio equipment often features VU meters, both for utility purposes (e.g. in recording equipment) and for aesthetics (in playback devices).

The original VU meter is a passive electromechanical device, namely a 200 µA DC d'Arsonval movement ammeter fed from a full-wave copper-oxide rectifier mounted within the meter case. The mass of the needle causes a relatively slow response, which in effect integrates or smooths the signal, with a rise time of 300 ms. This has the effect of averaging out peaks and troughs of short duration, and reflects the perceived loudness of the material more closely than the more modern and initially more expensive PPM meters. For this reason many audio practitioners prefer the VU meter to its alternatives, though the meter indication does not reflect some of the key features of the signal, most notably its peak level, which in many cases, must not pass a defined limit.

0 VU is equal to +4 dBu, or 1.228 volts RMS, a power of about 2.5 milliwatts when applied across a 600-ohm load. 0 VU is often referred to as "0 dB". The meter was designed not to measure the signal, but to let users aim the signal level to a target level of 0 VU (sometimes labelled 100%), so it is not important that the device is non-linear and imprecise for low levels. In effect, the scale ranges from −20 VU to +3 VU, with −3 VU right in the middle (half the power of 0 VU). Purely electronic devices may emulate the response of the needle; they are VU-meters in as much as they respect the standard.

In the broadcast industry, loudness monitoring was standardized, in 2009 in the United States by the ATSC A/85, in 2010 in Europe by the EBU R-128, in 2011 in Japan by the TR-B32, and in 2010 in Australia by the OP-59.

Lead 
The original designers of the VU meter were tasked with finding a way to measure complex audio signals with a simple technology.

Since a VU meter is a mechanical device, it can never reflect the instantaneous signal peaks of complex audio signals. The designers of the VU meter therefore took a different approach. They created a meter that did not measure peaks, but simply inferred them.  A real VU meter has a very specific "ballistic characteristic".  This means that it responds to changing audio signals at a very precise speed, rising from no signal to 99% of "0 VU" when a 1 kHz sine wave tone is applied for 300 milliseconds.

When using a VU meter, the audio system is calibrated with a sine wave tone at a "reference level" for the system. At the reference level, the VU meter shows "0" for a sine-wave tone, but the engineer must know that, with music or speech, to always infer that peak levels are always between 6 dB and 10 dB higher than the reference level. The usefulness of the VU meter comes from the fact that for most types of audio sources the system engineer can count on these peaks being within this range and can design the audio system with confidence. Good engineering practice is to always build in a little extra "headroom", as it is called, to cover the strange conditions where an audio signal might exceed normal peak levels or the equipment operator fails to adjust the levels correctly.  Typically the levels considered when designing systems using a VU meter are: 
 Reference level (typically +4 dBu, valid with tones only);
 Standard output level (10 dB above reference, typical peak levels);
 Clip level (6 dB above standard output level, "headroom" to allow for unusual conditions)

Standard characteristics 

The behaviour of VU meters is defined in ANSI C16.5-1942, British Standard BS 6840, and IEC 60268-17.

Reference level

Rise time 

The rise time, defined as the time it takes for the needle to reach 99% of the distance to 0 VU when the VU-meter is submitted to a signal that steps from 0 to a level that reads 0 VU, is 300 ms.

The overshoot must be within 1 to 1.5%.

The fall time is the same as the rise time, 300 ms.

Frequency response 

The level specification is meant at 1000 Hz. The reading should not depart from the reading at 1000 Hz by more than 0.2 dB from 35 Hz to 10 kHz or more than 0.5 dB between 25 Hz and 16 kHz.

Note that the specification mentions only sinusoid waveforms. Given the electromechanical principle of the meter, the deviation of the needle is actually approximately proportional to the average of the part of the signal with more than approximately 0.4 V instantaneously because of the two copper-oxide rectifiers always in series, which transfer function curve has a knee around 0.2 V. Signals generally do not have a sinusoidal waveform by far, even if they all fall within the VU-meter bandpass. The reading is the average of the voltage, and is not an indication of the power of the signal, which is proportional to the average of the square of the voltage, or the root-mean-square (RMS) value. As a conventional VU reading, however, it served its purpose as an indication a) of the overall level and dynamics of the signal and b) of the proximity to the maximum admitted level, to the operators of recording and broadcasting equipment. Maintenance staff could also use it as a measurement apparatus, to check for losses in transmissions and level alignment, provided that they used exclusively sine waves as test signals.

Impedance 
The VU meter and its attenuator should present a 7,500-ohm impedance to the circuit it is applied to, measured with a sinusoid signal that sets the indicator to 0 dB.

History 

The VU-meter was originally developed in 1939 by the combined effort of Bell Labs and broadcasters CBS and NBC. In the 1970s–80s, neon-filled, planar dual displays with up to 201 segments per stereo channel were popular among broadcasters as fast bar graph VU meters.

Other level meters 
The consumer audio industry often uses volume indicators that do not comply with any standard. 

BBC sound engineers would refer to the VU meter as the "Virtually Useless" meter, preferring the PPM.

Academic research has shown that an SVI or VU meter behaves differently to the average value and RMS meters. The ballistics shown by this instrument in response to signals with large crest factor position its readings halfway between both. For example, an increment of 3 dB in the crest factor of an audio signal gives approximately a fall of −3 dB in a RMS meter, −6 dB in an average meter, and −4 dB in a VU meter.

See also 
Audio equipment
Crest factor
Decibel
Loudness monitoring
Mixing console
Noise pollution
Nominal level
Peak meter
Peak programme meter
Programme level

References

External links 

AES Pro Audio Reference definition for VU meter
A New Standard Volume Indicator and Reference Level by Chinn, Gannett & Morris
The Bewildering Wilderness - "Navigating the complicated and frustrating world of audio standards"
Audio Level Meters
VU Meter Video
Q What’s the difference between PPM and VU meters?
Software to Design & Print Custom VU Meter Panels
VU Meter dBu & dBv Reference Chart

Sound production technology
Measuring instruments